The Baltic International Academy is the largest degree-awarding tertiary educational institution in Latvia teaching primarily in the Russian language and the largest non-government higher education establishment in the Baltic countries. It was established in 1992 as the Baltic Russian Institute. It adopted its current name in 2006. The academy has its main campus in Riga and has locations in  Daugavpils, Liepāja, Rēzekne, Jēkabpils, Ventspils, Smiltene and Jelgava. It has 4,500 students, including 450 foreign students from 15 countries.

See also
Education in Latvia
List of universities in Europe founded after 1945

External links
 Baltic International Academy

References

Universities and colleges in Latvia
Education in Riga
Private universities and colleges in Europe
Educational institutions established in 1992
1992 establishments in Latvia